Lha Thothori gNyan bTsan was the 28th King of Tibet according to the Tibetan legendary tradition. Lha "divine, pertaining to the gods of the sky" is an honorary title and not a part of his proper name.

He belonged to the Yarlung dynasty connected to the Yarlung district in Southern Tibet. Modern scholars believe that he was a historical ruler, as he is also mentioned in a Chinese source. They date his rule to the fifth century, because the 33rd king Songtsän Gampo died in 650; other calculations putting his birth at 173 or 254 are nowadays rejected. He did not rule over the whole of Tibet; his power was probably limited to the Yarlung Tsangpo Grand Canyon area.

According to an indigenous legend, Buddhist scriptures (among them the Kāraṇḍavyūhasūtra) first arrived in Tibet in his time. The tale claims that this happened in a miraculous way (the volumes fell from the sky on the roof of the royal palace a motif which also happened to one of the royal personages of the name Indrabhuti), but there may be an historical background (arrival of Buddhist missionaries). In any case, this first contact of Tibetans with Buddhism cannot have been more than an incident without lasting impact.

The cintamani is said to be one of four relics that came in a chest that fell from the sky (many terma fell from the sky in caskets) during the reign of king Lha Thothori Nyantsen. Though the king did not understand the purpose of the objects, he still kept them in a position of reverence. Several years later, two mysterious strangers appeared at the court of the king, explaining the four relics, which included the Buddha's bowl and a mani stone (a jewel, crystal or gem with the om mani padme hum mantra inscribed on it). These few objects were the bringers of the Dharma to Tibet.

Popular culture
In the ninth episode (numbered 2.002, the second episode of the second season) of the television show Twin Peaks, the character of Dale Cooper tells Agent Rosenfield that "the first Tibetan king to be touched by the Dharma was King Ha-tho-tho-ri gnyan-btsan. He and succeeding kings were collectively known as the Happy Generations."  That spelling of the name (so spelled in the transcribed screenplay) differs from the spelling given in the DVD subtitles, "Hathatha Rignamputsan", but is almost identical to a spelling given above; so it is probably this King of Tibet to which Cooper's tale referred, especially since the reign of that King also corresponds to the legendary arrival of Buddhist scripture in Tibet.

References

Tibetan kings
Year of birth unknown
Year of death unknown